Cathy Schoen is an American economist at the New York Academy of Medicine. She previously served as the executive director of Commonwealth Fund Council of Economic Advisors and as the senior vice president for Policy, Research, and Evaluation at the Commonwealth Fund. Her research is concentrated on health economics and health care policy.

Education and career 
Schoen attended Smith College for her undergraduate career and received a degree in economics. She also holds a master's degree in economics from Boston College. She served as a member of U.S. President Jimmy Carter's health insurance task force in the late 1970s.

Selected publications

References

External links 

 Personal website
Home page at New York Academy of Medicine

Living people
American women economists
Smith College alumni
Morrissey College of Arts & Sciences alumni
Year of birth missing (living people)